The South Shore Line is a commuter rail line from Chicago to South Bend, Indiana. 

South Shore Line may also refer to:

Chicago South Shore and South Bend Railroad, commonly referred to as South Shore Line, a freight rail company operating on the commuter rail line
South Shore Line, the original name of the Braintree Branch of the MBTA Red Line in Massachusetts, USA
South Shore Railroad, a railroad in Massachusetts
Duluth, South Shore and Atlantic Railway
South Shore Line (Montreal), a proposed rapid transit line in Montreal, Quebec
Southern Railway zone, in parts of coastal southern India

See also

 Shoreline (disambiguation)
 South Shore (disambiguation)
 North Shore Line (disambiguation)
 
 South (disambiguation)
 Shore (disambiguation)
 Line (disambiguation)